Wayne "Big Truck" Braithwaite (born August 9, 1975) is a Guyanese former professional boxer who competed from 1997 to 2012, and held the WBC cruiserweight title from 2002 to 2005.

Professional career
The highlight of his early amateur career was winning a gold medal at the 1994 Junior Pan American boxing championships held in Venezuela. He also won gold in the junior middleweight division at the Novices boxing championships then a gold medal at the Goodwill Games in Barbados before going professional.

Braithwaite turned professional in 1996, winning with a KO over Olympian John Douglas. For only his tenth fight, in 2000, he was pitted against Dale Brown, who had two years' more professional experience. Braithwaite stopped Brown in eight rounds, winning the WBC–NABF International cruiserweight titles. In 2002, Braithwaite received his first opportunity at a world championship when he faced Vincenzo Cantatore for the WBC cruiserweight title. Fighting in Cantatore's native Italy, Braithwaite was able to weather several onslaughts by his opponent, as well as questionable calls by the referee, en route to a tenth-round stoppage victory. This made Braithwaite only the second boxer from Guyana to win a world title. He successfully defended the title three times, reaching the rank of world's #1 cruiserweight by The Ring magazine during 2003–05.

Braithwaite's undefeated run and title reign came to an end in 2005 when he lost to Jean Marc Mormeck via unanimous decision. The bout was a unification for both the WBC and WBA (Super) cruiserweight titles. The early portion of the fight was dominated by Braithwaite, but Mormeck was able to regain lost ground and win the decision. In Braithwaite's next outing in the same year, he was stopped in four rounds by Guillermo Jones. In 2007, Braithwaite lost to Enzo Maccarinelli in a failed challenge for the WBO cruiserweight title, in which Maccarinelli won a dominant unanimous decision.

A momentary career resurgence for Braithwaite in 2008 saw him upset then-undefeated and future unified cruiserweight world champion Yoan Pablo Hernández, stopping him in three rounds and earning him a WBA and WBC regional title each. Braithwaite was unable to sustain this form in his next fight the following year, losing a unanimous decision to multiple cruiserweight champion Steve Cunningham. Amid a period of sparse activity, consisting of a lone win and two consecutive losses, Braithwaite has not fought since 2012.

Professional boxing record

References

1975 births
Living people
Sportspeople from Georgetown, Guyana
Cruiserweight boxers
World Boxing Council champions
Guyanese male boxers
Light-heavyweight boxers
Heavyweight boxers
World cruiserweight boxing champions